Vladimir Simonov may refer to:

 Vladimir Simonov (actor) (born 1957), Russian actor
 Vladimir Simonov (engineer) (born 1935), Russian engineer